The Hunter of Fall is a 1974 German drama film directed by Harald Reinl and starring ,  and Siegfried Rauch It depicts the battle between a Bavarian gamekeeper and a poacher. It is based on the novel The Hunter of Fall by Ludwig Ganghofer.

The film's sets were designed by the art director Peter Rothe. Location shooting took place in Bavaria and the Austrian Tyrol.

Cast
   as Modei
   as Friedl, Jäger von Fall
  Siegfried Rauch as Huisentoni
  Klaus Löwitsch as Lenz
  Hansi Knoteck as Friedls Mutter
  Viktor Staal as Förster
  Beppo Brem as Doktormartl
  as Huisenblasi
  Sepp Rist as Der alte Huisen
  Alexander Golling  as Grenzbauer
  Rudolf Prack  as Prince Regent

References

Bibliography
 Bock, Hans-Michael & Bergfelder, Tim. The Concise CineGraph. Encyclopedia of German Cinema. Berghahn Books, 2009.

External links

1974 films
West German films
1970s German-language films
Films directed by Harald Reinl
Remakes of German films
Films based on The Hunter of Fall
Films set in the 1890s
Constantin Film films
1970s historical drama films
German historical drama films
1974 drama films
1970s German films